Rhopobota blanditana is a species of moth of the family Tortricidae. It is found in China (Sichuan, Guizhou), Vietnam and Thailand.

References

Moths described in 1988
Eucosmini